Domina Eberle Spencer (September 26, 1920 – 2022) was an American mathematician who was Professor at the University of Connecticut. 

Spencer was born on September 26, 1920, and earned her Ph.D. in 1942 from the Massachusetts Institute of Technology under the supervision of Dirk Jan Struik. She worked on electrodynamics and field theory. 

Spencer was married to Parry Moon, with whom she wrote many of her books and papers and introduced holors. Her death, at age 101, was reported by the University of Connecticut in May 2022.

References

External links
Domina Spencer  home page
A biographical article in the Natural Philosophers Wikipedia

1920 births
2022 deaths
20th-century American mathematicians
21st-century American mathematicians
American women mathematicians
University of Connecticut faculty
Massachusetts Institute of Technology alumni
20th-century women mathematicians
21st-century women mathematicians
American centenarians
Women centenarians
20th-century American women
21st-century American women